The School of Petroleum Technology (SPT), formerly known as the Institute of Petroleum Technology is part of the Pandit Deendayal Petroleum University, in Gandhinagar. It offers courses addressing the technological requirements of the oil and gas sector. The programmes offered include education in aspects of the petroleum industry, including exploration, production, drilling, reservoir, transportation, refining & geosciences of energy and petroleum sector. The B.Tech (petroleum engineering) programme of SPT is approved by the All India Council for Technical Education (AICTE).

External links
 Official website

Buildings and structures in Gandhinagar
Universities and colleges in Gujarat
Energy in Gujarat
Petroleum engineering schools
Institutions of Petroleum in India
Science and technology in Gujarat